The Luther Brannon House was a stone bungalow structure at 151 Oak Ridge Turnpike in Oak Ridge, Tennessee, United States, where it was one of the few buildings remaining from before World War II.

The house was built in 1941 by Owen Hackworth and just months later was acquired by the U.S. Army for the Manhattan Project. It was one of about 180 existing structures that were spared from demolition after the area was acquired for Manhattan Project production activities. The house is believed to have been used as headquarters for local project operations and living quarters for General Leslie Groves until the Army completed construction of new administration buildings.

After the war, when most other remaining pre-war structures in Oak Ridge were torn down, the house was left standing. As of 1991, it was one of only three pre-World War II houses remaining in Oak Ridge, the others being Freels Cabin and the J. B. Jones House.   It was listed on the National Register of Historic Places due to its association with General Groves and the early development of Oak Ridge.

The house suffered significant damage from a fire in July 2014. As of April 2020, the fire damage still had not been repaired, and the property was listed for sale. As of February 2021, the house has been demolished, and was removed from the National Register in October, 2021

References

Houses completed in 1941
Houses in Anderson County, Tennessee
Houses on the National Register of Historic Places in Tennessee
Oak Ridge, Tennessee
National Register of Historic Places in Anderson County, Tennessee